The 2002 U.S. Virgin Islands gubernatorial election took place on November 5, 2002 to select the Governor of the United States Virgin Islands. The election was held concurrently with the 2002 United States midterm elections.

Incumbent Democratic Governor Charles Wesley Turnbull won re-election with 50% of the vote over Independent candidate John de Jongh.

General election

Results

References

Gubernatorial
United States Virgin Islands